Branchioplax is an extinct genus of crab which existed in Alaska and Washington during the Eocene period. It was first named by Mary Rathbun in 1916, and contains ten species, including Branchioplax washingtoniana from the Hoko River Formation, Branchioplax carmanahensis, and Branchioplax ballingi.

References

External links
 The Family Goneplacidae MacLeay, 1838 (Crustacea: Decapoda, Brachyura): systematics phylogeny and fossil records.
 Branchioplax at the Paleobiology Database

Crabs
Eocene crustaceans
Eocene arthropods of North America
Fossil taxa described in 1916
Taxa named by Mary J. Rathbun